Light cavalry is lightly armed and armoured troops mounted on horses.

Light Cavalry may also refer to:

 Light Cavalry HAC, a volunteer military unit associated with the City of London
 Light Cavalry (horse)
 Light Cavalry (1927 film)
 Light Cavalry (1935 French film)
 Light Cavalry (1935 German film)
 Leichte Kavallerie (Light Cavalry), an operetta by Franz von Suppé, notable for the Light Cavalry Overture